Ivet Bahar is a Turkish-American computational biologist, currently serving as a Distinguished Professor and the John K. Vries Chair at University of Pittsburgh. Dr. Bahar is also the co-founder of an internationally acclaimed PhD program in Computational Biology, CPCB, jointly offered by the University of Pittsburgh and  Carnegie Mellon University. She was elected to the National Academy of Sciences in 2020.

Research
Dr. Bahar adapted fundamental theories and methods of polymer statistical mechanics to biomolecular structure and dynamics. She pioneered a modified version of the classical Rouse model, to examine the collective dynamics of proteins modeled as elastic network models (ENMs). ENMs have three strengths: simplicity, ability to yield a unique solution for each structure, and efficient applicability to supramolecular complexes/assemblies. Her theory and methods have withstood numerous tests since their inception, and established fundamental concepts in molecular biology: the role of entropy-driven fluctuations defined by 3D contact topology in optimizing biomolecular interactions; the evolutionary pressure for robustly maintaining structural dynamics to support flexible mechanisms of actions – not only structure to ensure stability; the ability of proteins to exploit their structure-encoded dynamics to adapt to promiscuous interactions and mutations as demonstrated in numerous applications, including neurotransmitter transporters in recent years. Recent application to chromosomal dynamics provided insights into the physical basis of gene co-expression and regulation events.

Personal life
Dr. Bahar currently resides in Pittsburgh. She came to the United States to become a professor at University of Pittsburgh, Department of Molecular Genetics & Biochemistry in 2001. Notably, she is the first Turkish female scientist elected to the National Academy of Sciences of the United States. In 2016, she was invited by President Barack Obama as a guest speaker to the White House to give a speech titled "Big Data in Multiscale Modeling and Biology".

References

Year of birth missing (living people)
Living people
American people of Turkish descent
University of Pittsburgh faculty
21st-century American biologists
Turkish biologists
Istanbul Technical University alumni
Members of the United States National Academy of Sciences